25 Pashons - Coptic calendar - 27 Pashons

Fixed commemorations
All fixed commemorations below are observed on 26 Pashons (3 June) by the Coptic Orthodox Church.

Saints
 Thomas the Apostle (72 AD)

References
Coptic Synexarion

Days of the Coptic calendar